The Scottish Junior Football East Region Premier League North also known for sponsorship reasons as the McBookie.com East Premier League North, was the second-tier division of the East Region of the Scottish Junior Football Association and sat parallel with the East Region Premier League South.

The league came into existence under the 'North' name for the 2006–07 season, although a 'Tayside District league' had been in place below the East Super League since 2002–03, using the structure of a common 'East Region' top tier and lower regional divisions in place of the old structure of three separate regional leagues in that part of Scotland, with the Tayside Junior Football League the historic local competition. The North Division was further expanded for 2013–14 season following league reconstruction in the East Region, by absorbing the more northerly clubs from the dissolved East Region Central Division.

Up until season 2017–18, there was a Premier League at tier 2 and North and South Divisions at tier 3. The large-scale movement of clubs to the East of Scotland Football League has resulted in the structure being flattened. Further league reconstruction for the 2019–20 season split the Super League into North and South divisions, reducing the number of Premier League North teams. It now comprises 8 clubs who each play each other home and away to give 28 league fixtures.

Member clubs for the 2019–20 season

Winners

As Tayside District, one of three third-tier divisions:
2002–03: Lochee United
2003–04: Carnoustie Panmure
2004–05: Dundee North End
2005–06: Kinnoull
As East Region North, one of three third-tier divisions:
2006–07: Forfar West End
2007–08: Blairgowrie
2008–09: Montrose Roselea
2009–10: Broughty Athletic
2010–11: Downfield
2011–12: Dundee Violet
2012–13: Kirriemuir Thistle
As one of two third-tier divisions:
2013–14: Dundee North End (2)
2014–15: Thornton Hibernian
2015–16: Downfield (2)
2016–17: Kirriemuir Thistle (2)
2017–18: Dundee North End (3)
As one of two second-tier divisions:
2018–19: Dundee North End (4)
2019-20: No champion

Notes

References

External links
East Region North Division at Non-League Scotland (archive version, 2007-08 membership)
 Premier League North table at East Region SJFA

3
Sports leagues established in 2002
2002 establishments in Scotland
Sports leagues disestablished in 2020
Football in Angus, Scotland
Football in Dundee
Football in Perth and Kinross
2020 disestablishments in Scotland